José María Velasco may refer to:

José María Velasco Gómez (1840–1912), Mexican painter
José María Velasco Ibarra (1893–1979), president of Ecuador
Temascalcingo, officially Temascalcingo de José María Velasco, a municipality in the State of Mexico
José María Velasco (Mexico City Metrobús), a BRT station in Mexico City

Velasco, Jose Maria